The artery of bulb of penis (artery of the urethral bulb or bulbourethral artery) is a short artery of large caliber which arises from the internal pudendal artery between the two layers of fascia (the superior and inferior) of the urogenital diaphragm. It passes medialward, pierces the inferior fascia of the urogenital diaphragm and gives off branches which ramify in the bulb of the urethra and in the posterior part of the corpus spongiosum.

Additional images

References

External links
 
 

Arteries of the abdomen
Human penis anatomy